Of (possibly from  Ophious) is a town and district of Trabzon Province in the Black Sea region of Turkey. It is located in the eastern part of Trabzon and is an important historical district of the province. The mayor is Salim Salih Sarıalioğlu (AKP).

Etymology and settlement origins

There are several stories about the origins of Of's name. Of was called Ofis in 1910 by  Pontic Greek speaking inhabitants. According to another view it means "village" or "settlement" in the Laz language (Laz: ოფუტე/oput'e), as the old name of the town is mentioned as "Opiunte" on the Tabula Peutingeriana. By another version of events, the city got its name from a nearby river described by Arrian as Ophis, a Greek word for "snake". The Ophius stream - which snakes (zigzags) its way from around 3300 meters altitude in the Pontic Mountains towards the coastal town of Of - was renamed as "Solaklı" during the 1950s Turkification process which is a common policy in whole of Turkey.

Mixed farming settlements of Pontic Greeks were established along most bends of the river at least from the Middle Ages onwards, making it one of the most densely settled valley-systems on the southern coast of the Black Sea. The area has been inhabited by the native Colchian people during the ancient times. During most of its history the district and its hinterland were subjugated to nearby Trabzon city. The southern districts Dernekpazarı, Çaykara and Hayrat of Trabzon province and the western half of İkizdere district today part of Rize province were historically also part of the region of Of.

A minority of Muslim Pontic Greek speakers, using a dialect called "Ophitic" (or Romeyka), still live in the area.

Notable people

Ali Ağaoğlu Businessman (1959)
Erdoğan Bayraktar Politician, The ex Minister of Environment and Urban Planning of Turkey
Fatih Çakıroğlu (1981) wrestling European champion
Hasan Küçükakyüz (1957) Commander of the Turkish Air Force
Fatih Öztürk (1983) Football player
Mustafa Varank (1976) The Minister of Industry and Technology
Mehmet Yılmaz (1979) Football player

See also
Çakıroğlu İsmail Ağa Konağı

References

External links

 District governor's official website 

Populated places in Trabzon Province
Fishing communities in Turkey
Populated coastal places in Turkey
Districts of Trabzon Province